= Anders Petters stuga =

Swedish Christmas song

Anders Petters stuga or Anders Perssons stuga står i ljusan låga is an old Swedish Christmas song of unknown origin. It is often sung when dancing around the Christmas tree. Lyrically, the song deals with a fire in "Anders Petters's" cottage. While the lyrics don't mention Christmas, the word ljusen ("lights, candles") is here strongly associated with the candles lit at Christmastime.

== Publication ==
- Julens önskesångbok, 1997, under the lines "Tjugondag Knut dansar julen ut", credited as "folksong"

== Recordings ==
An early recording was done by Margareta Schönström in May 1925, and the record came out in 1926.
